This is a round-up of the 1986 Sligo Senior Football Championship. Tubbercurry finally overcame St. Mary's after three successive final defeats to their great rivals, to win their first title in a decade, and their eighteenth in all.

First round

Quarter finals

Semi-finals

Sligo Senior Football Championship Final

References

 Sligo Champion (July–September 1986)

Sligo Senior Football Championship
Sligo Senior Football Championship